Mayra or Mäyrä is a given name. Notable people with the name include:

Mayra Andrade (born 1985), Cape Verdean singer who lives and records in Paris, France
Mayra Conde (born 1969), professional Personal Trainer and mixed martial artist
Mayra Flores (born 1986), American politician
Mayra Gómez Kemp (born 1948), movie star
Mayra García (born 1972), female beach volleyball player from Mexico
Mayra González (born 1968), female rower from Cuba
Mayra Huerta, (born 1970), female beach volleyball player from Mexico
Mayra Matos (born 1988), beauty pageant contestant from Puerto Rico
Mayra Mendoza (born 1983), Argentine politician who served as National Deputy from 2011 to 2019
Mayra Montero (born 1952), Cuban-Puerto Rican writer
Mayra Rosales (born 1980), was one of the heaviest living people in the world
Mayra Santos-Febres (born 1966), Puerto Rican professor of literature, poet, novelist, and critic
Mayra Verónica (born 1977), Cuban-American model who worked in the United States